Justice Cunningham (born January 14, 1991) is a former American football tight end. He played college football at South Carolina. In the 2013 NFL Draft, he was the 254th and last player to be drafted, making Cunningham the year's Mr. Irrelevant. Cunningham was the second consecutive Mr. Irrelevant for the Indianapolis Colts, who chose Chandler Harnish as the last pick of 2012 NFL Draft.

High school
Cunningham graduated from Central High School (Pageland, South Carolina) in 2009. While there, he collected his fair share of accolades. His senior year, he helped Central reach the 2008 Class AA state finals and a 14–1 record while playing tight end and defensive end. This same year, he collected 20 sacks. His efforts landed him a spot on the All-State First-team, the 2008 Shrine Bowl of the Carolinas, and on PrepStar's All-Atlantic Region Team. As a junior, he caught 21 passes for 400 yards and 8 touchdowns. On defense, he registered 92 tackles, seven sacks, two interceptions, and three fumble recoveries. He also excelled on the basketball court averaging 12 points and 11 rebounds his junior year.

Professional career

Indianapolis Colts
Cunningham had the "honor" of being Mr. Irrelevant in the 2013 NFL Draft, being the 254th, and last player selected in the draft. On September 2, 2013, he was waived. On September 3, 2013, he was signed to the practice squad. On November 19, 2013, he was promoted to the active roster. He played his first regular season game on November 24, 2013 against Arizona. Cunningham had one catch for four yards. On November 26, 2013, he was waived.

St. Louis / Los Angeles Rams
On November 28, 2013, Cunningham was signed to the practice squad. On December 31, 2013, he was signed a future contract.

On September 1, 2014, he was placed on injured reserve. On September 2, 2014, he was waived from injured reserve. On October 29, 2014, Cunningham was signed to the practice squad. On November 25, 2014, he was promoted to the active roster.

On September 5, 2015, he was waived and was signed to the practice squad the next day. On October 15, 2015, he was promoted to the active roster. On November 28, 2015, he was waived. On December 1, 2015, he was re-signed to the practice squad.

On September 3, 2016, Cunningham was waived by the Rams as part of final roster cuts.

References

1991 births
Living people
People from Pageland, South Carolina
Players of American football from South Carolina
African-American players of American football
American football tight ends
South Carolina Gamecocks football players
Indianapolis Colts players
St. Louis Rams players
Los Angeles Rams players
21st-century African-American sportspeople